Brampton West is a provincial electoral district in central Ontario, Canada. It was created for the 2007 provincial election. 72.8% of the district was created from Brampton West—Mississauga while 27.2% was carved from Brampton Centre.

The riding includes that part of Brampton west  of a line following Hurontario Street to Vodden Street to Kennedy Road.

Members of Provincial Parliament

Election results

2007 electoral reform referendum

Sources

Elections Ontario Past Election Results
Map of Brampton West riding for 2018 election

Ontario provincial electoral districts
Politics of Brampton